Albanian Supercup 2011 is the 18th edition of the Albanian Supercup since its establishment in 1989. The match was contested between the 2010–11 Albanian Superliga champions Skënderbeu Korçë and the 2010–11 Albanian Cup winners KF Tirana. The match was played on 18 August 2011.

After 17 editions played in Qemal Stafa Stadium, Tirane, this time the venue for the final was the Skënderbeu Stadium hosting its first Albanian Supercup final.

Match details

See also
 2010–11 Albanian Superliga
 2010–11 Albanian Cup

References

2011
Supercup
Albanian Supercup, 2011
Albanian Supercup, 2011